Rheinsberg is a 1967 West German romantic comedy film directed by Kurt Hoffmann and starring Cornelia Froboess, Christian Wolff and Werner Hinz. The film is based on a novel by Kurt Tucholsky set partly in Rheinsberg. Four years earlier Hoffmann had directed another Tucholsky adaptation Gripsholm Castle.

The film's sets were designed by the art director Werner Schlichting. It was shot at the Spandau Studios in Berlin and on location in Bremen and Schleswig-Holstein. As the real Rheinsberg was then in Communist-controlled East Germany, alternative locations in the West doubled for it.

Cast

References

Bibliography

External links 
 
 Rheinsberg at filmportal.de/en

1967 films
1967 romantic comedy films
German romantic comedy films
West German films
1960s German-language films
Films directed by Kurt Hoffmann
Films based on German novels
Films set in 1912
Constantin Film films
German historical comedy films
1960s historical comedy films
German historical romance films
Films shot at Spandau Studios
1960s German films